Miss Malaysia Universe 1979, the 13th edition of the Miss Universe Malaysia, was held on 28 April 1979 at the Merlin Hotel, Kuala Lumpur. Irene Wong of Pahang was crowned by the outgoing titleholder, Yasmin Yusoff  of Kuala Lumpur at the end of the event. She then represented Malaysia at the Miss Universe 1979 pageant in Perth, Australia.

21 contestants from 13 states in Malaysia were selected as finalists in a field of 35 semifinalists. The preliminary competition was held in Malacca on 30 March 1979.

The grand final event saw the contestants paraded in national costumes, evening dresses and swimsuits. There were several special awards on offer such as Miss Personality, Miss Amity and Miss Photogenic. The contestants were judged based on poise, catwalk, hairstyle, overall appearance, overall style, legs, figures and facial beauty.

Results

Delegates 
  - Pauline Ee Ngui
  - Norhayati Abdul Wahab
  - Janet Poon
  - Saharah Abu Bakar
  - Zubaidah Naziadin
  - Sandy Lai
  - Winnie Chow
  - Florence Corina Yong
  - Marina Sally Amin
  - Irene Wong Sun Ching
  - Madeline Malig Fong
  - Zalina Mohmed Ali
  - Marianne Phang
  - Josephine Lam
  - Helena Woo
  - Cherrie Marie Enchane
  - Debbie Oh Paik Chin
  - Julie Ann Pinto
  - Ruby Georgina Rodriguez
  - Annie Chin
  - Dolly Chung
  - Nora Eliza Chin Yee

References

External links 
 

1979 in Malaysia
1979 beauty pageants
1979
Beauty pageants in Malaysia